One percent (or 1%) or One percenter may refer to:

Groups of people
The wealthiest 1% of people in the United States, from the Occupy Movement's slogan, "We are the 99%"
One percenter (motorcycle), a member of an outlaw motorcycle club derived from the statement "99% of motorcyclists are law-abiding citizens"
1%Club, a non profit group using the Internet to help those in developing countries

Film and television
 1% (film), a 2017 Australian film
 "1%" (South Park), an episode of South Park
 The One Percent (film), a 2006 documentary about the growing wealth gap in America

Songs
 "1%" (song), by Tomomi Itano, 2013
 "1%", by Funeral for a Friend from Chapter and Verse, 2015
 "1%", by Jane's Addiction from Jane's Addiction, 1987
 "1%", by Kiiara, 2018
 "1%", by Oscar Scheller featuring Lily Allen, 2019
 "One Percent", by Gorillaz from The Now Now, 2018
 "One Percent", by Rich White Ladies, 2012

Other uses
 1% rule (Internet culture), a rule of thumb pertaining to participation in an internet community
 1% rule (aviation medicine), a risk threshold for medical incapacitation
 1% milk, a grade of milk containing 1% butterfat
 One percenter (Australian rules football), various small actions in the game that help the team win
 One Percent for the Planet, an international organization
 The One Percent Doctrine, a nonfiction book by Ron Suskind

See also
 Two percent (disambiguation)
 99% (disambiguation)
 1% of Anything, a South Korean TV drama